Arise! may refer to

 "The March of the Volunteers", the Chinese national anthem, also sometimes known by the English translation of its refrain Qilai!
 Arise!, an album by Amebix

See also
 Arise (disambiguation)